Potting On is a radio situation comedy broadcast on BBC Radio 4. It stars poet and author Pam Ayres and veteran actor Geoffrey Whitehead as an aging couple running a garden centre with the help of various oddball employees. The supporting cast includes Trevor Bannister, Alex Tregear, and Karl Theobald. The show is written by Chris Thompson and Peter Reynolds.

Plot
Pam (Pam Ayres) and Gordon (Geoffrey Whitehead) are a long-married couple who run a small garden centre. Gordon is a creature of habit while Pam longs to break out of her humdrum routine. The humour revolves around her efforts to persuade him to try something new, or at least stop holding her back. For instance, for their annual holiday, Gordon is content to return to their caravan which has been parked for years in Swanage, while she tries to organize a trip to some exotic location overseas, or at least somewhere other than Swanage.

Other employees also appear including teenager Carol, the cashier, who is a modern girl and has an array of boyfriends, naïve deputy manager Dave who has an attraction to Carol, and bizarre elderly gardener Roy who occasionally has a good idea.

Format
Geoffrey Whitehead's role is to set up situations into which Pam Ayres delivers punchlines in her distinctive brogue. For example, in an episode where Gordon becomes obsessed by an Indiana Jones-style computer game and stays up till the early hours of the morning, there is the following exchange:

Gordon: I'm trying to find the hidden treasures of Nefertiti!
Pam: Well come to bed then, I'll make sure you get yer 'ands on 'em!

The same actors portray Pam and Gordon in sketches on the comedy and poetry show Ayres on the Air.

Cast
 Pam Grant - Pam Ayres
 Gordon Grant - Geoffrey Whitehead
 Carol - Alex Tregear
 Dave - Karl Theobald
 Roy - Trevor Bannister

Episodes

Broadcast history
The show was broadcast originally on BBC Radio 4, with repeat broadcasts airing on BBC Radio 7 and BBC Radio 4 Extra.

External links

British Comedy Guide
Episode listing from epguides.com

BBC Radio comedy programmes
2008 radio programme debuts
BBC Radio 4 programmes